Mary Marg Helgenberger (born November 16, 1958) is an American actress. She began her career in the early 1980s and first came to attention for playing the role of Siobhan Ryan on the daytime soap opera Ryan's Hope from 1982 to 1986. She is best known for her role as Catherine Willows in the CBS police procedural drama CSI: Crime Scene Investigation (2000–13) and the subsequent TV movie Immortality (2015). She reprised the role in the sequel CSI: Vegas Season 2, which premiered on September 29, 2022. Helgenberger is also known for playing the role of K.C. Koloski in the ABC drama China Beach (1988–91), which earned her the 1990 Emmy Award for Outstanding Supporting Actress in a Drama Series. She is also known for roles in the TV series Under the Dome and Intelligence, and the films Species (1995), Species II (1998), Erin Brockovich (2000), and Mr. Brooks (2007).

Early life
Helgenberger was born November 16, 1958 in Fremont, Nebraska, to Mary Kay (née Bolte), a nurse, and Hugh Helgenberger, a meat inspector. She was raised in North Bend, Nebraska, where she graduated from North Bend Central High School. Helgenberger is of Irish and German descent and had a Roman Catholic upbringing. She has one older sister named Ann and a younger brother named Curt. Helgenberger played the French horn in her high school marching band. Until she went to college, Helgenberger aspired to be a nurse like her mother, but attended Kearney State College (now the University of Nebraska at Kearney) in Kearney, Nebraska, then attended Northwestern University's School of Speech in Evanston, Illinois, (now the School of Communication) and earned a B.S. degree in speech and drama.

Career

Helgenberger began as a nightly weathergirl at KHGI-TV, the ABC affiliate in Kearney, while attending college (her name was changed by the producer to Margi McCarty. McCarty was her grandmother's maiden name). During the summer, she also worked as a deboner at her father's meatpacking plant. After portraying the role of Blanche Dubois in a university production of A Streetcar Named Desire, she developed an interest in acting.

While performing in a summer 1981 NU campus production of Shakespeare's Taming of the Shrew, where she played Kate, Helgenberger was spotted by a scout for the TV soap opera Ryan's Hope. Soon after completing college, Helgenberger landed her first professional role on the long-running ABC Daytime soap opera in March 1982, playing amateur cop Siobhan Ryan Novak DuBujak, a role previously played by Ann Gillespie. After nearly four years, Helgenberger left the show in January 1986 to pursue new opportunities.

Helgenberger guest-starred in episodes of the ABC series Spenser: For Hire, NBC's Matlock, and ABC's thirtysomething. She also played a regular role as Natalie Thayer, opposite Margot Kidder and James Read, on the six-episode drama comedy series Shell Game (1987).

She then starred as Karen Charlene "K.C." Koloski, a prostitute turned entrepreneur, on the ABC war drama series China Beach from 1988 to 1991. The role earned her an Emmy Award for Outstanding Supporting Actress in a Drama Series in 1990.

In 1989, Helgenberger made her feature-film debut in a leading role as an all-night answering-service operator in one segment of the Wheat brothers' horror anthology After Midnight. She followed it up with a role in Steven Spielberg's romantic comedy-drama Always (starring Richard Dreyfuss, Holly Hunter, and John Goodman), a modern version of the original 1943 Victor Fleming film A Guy Named Joe.

During the early to mid-1990s, Helgenberger played the love interest to Woody Harrelson's character in The Cowboy Way (1994), and had a small role as Capt. Alison Sinclair in Michael Bay's action comedy film Bad Boys (1995). She also played Dr. Laura Baker, a molecular biologist, in Roger Donaldson's science-fiction thriller, Species (1995), and reprised the role in a sequel, Species II (1998).

Helgenberger had roles in the television films Not on the Frontline and In Sickness and in Health. She played opposite Bruno Kirby in I'll Be Waiting, and as a novelist on the miniseries Stephen King's The Tommyknockers opposite Jimmy Smits. After playing a recurring role as George Clooney's love interest on NBC's medical drama ER, Helgenberger appeared as David Caruso's sex-starved widow on Showtime's Elmore Leonard's Gold Coast. She starred with Steven Seagal in the 1997 action film Fire Down Below and portrayed the furious sibling to Steven Weber's character on the miniseries about the elusive Gulf War syndrome, Thanks of a Grateful Nation. She also starred opposite Ann-Margret in Showtime's Happy Face Murders.

In 2000, Helgenberger made a guest appearance in the Valentine's Day episode of Frasier, in which Frasier (Kelsey Grammer) finally wears down his dad Martin's resistance and gets the older man to accompany him to the opera. Actually, this invitation is but a smokescreen, so that Frasier can "accidentally" run into his newest dream girl Emily (Helgenberger).

Starting in October 2000, Helgenberger starred in the role of Catherine Willows, a former show girl employed as a blood-spatter analyst, on the hit CBS drama CSI: Crime Scene Investigation. Her performance as the female lead has earned her two Emmy nominations and two Golden Globe nominations. In 2005, she and her fellow cast members won the Screen Actors Guild Award for Outstanding Performance by an Ensemble in a Drama Series. When CSI first started filming, Helgenberger visited the Clark County Coroner's Office to learn about her role, even viewing autopsies in progress. Helgenberger got the chance to act with her husband, Alan Rosenberg, when he guest-starred on CSI, season five ("Weeping Willows") and season seven ("Leaving Las Vegas").

During her time on the show, Helgenberger acted in the feature film Erin Brockovich and portrayed Patsy Ramsey on the miniseries about the mysterious murder of six-year-old beauty-pageant contestant JonBenét Ramsey in Perfect Murder, Perfect Town. She also starred as Dennis Quaid's wife and Scarlett Johansson's mother in writer-director Paul Weitz's romantic drama comedy In Good Company (2004).

In 2006, Helgenberger's hometown of North Bend, Nebraska, renamed the street on which Helgenberger had her childhood home "Helgenberger Avenue".

In 2007, she was in the film Mr. Brooks with Kevin Costner in which her character's daughter is played by Danielle Panabaker, the sister of Kay Panabaker, who plays her fictional daughter on CSI.

In April 2008, Helgenberger was chosen as an endorser of the Got Milk? campaign.

In December 2009, Forbes magazine placed Helgenberger third among primetime's top-earning women, with estimated earnings of $9.5 million, after Tyra Banks and Katherine Heigl.

Helgenberger received the 2,458th star on the Hollywood Walk of Fame on January 23, 2012, for her television work.

She lent her voice as Greek goddess Hera to the straight-to-video animated film Wonder Woman.

Following William Petersen's departure from CSI, Helgenberger became one of the two highest paid actors in any of the CSI franchises, earning $375,000 per episode, the same as David Caruso, and $25,000 more per episode than Laurence Fishburne.

Helgenberger only appeared in the first 12 episodes of the 12th season of CSI, as she wanted to return to the stage. The producers said they left the door open for Helgenberger if she wanted to return. Helgenberger left the show on January 25, 2012, during a two-part episode ("Ms. Willows Regrets" and "Willows in the Wind"). The last one was the most-watched episode of the season with 14.26 million viewers.

Helgenberger also starred as Lilian Strand in the series Intelligence alongside Josh Holloway and Meghan Ory. Additionally, she briefly returned to CSI as Catherine for the 300th episode. In February 2015, she joined the third season of Under the Dome.

In May–June 2014, Helgenberger acted onstage in a production of the 2011 play The Other Place by Sharr White, put on by the Barrington Stage Company in Pittsfield, Massachusetts.  In September–October 2016, she appeared at the Arena Stage in Washington, D.C., in a revival of Lillian Hellman's The Little Foxes.

In 2022, Helgenberger became a series regular on CSI: Vegas, joining the show in its second season and reprising her long-running role of Catherine Willows.

Personal life
In 1984, Helgenberger met Alan Rosenberg, a guest actor on Ryan's Hope. The two became friends and started dating in 1986. They married in 1989 and have one son, Hugh Howard Rosenberg (b. 1990), named after Helgenberger's late father. On December 1, 2008, the couple announced that they were separating, and on March 25, 2009, she filed for divorce. Their divorce was finalized in February 2010.

As a result of Helgenberger's mother's 27-year battle against breast cancer, Helgenberger and Rosenberg became involved in breast-cancer-related charity and have hosted a benefit called Marg and Alan's Celebrity Weekend annually in Omaha since 1999.

In April 2022, Helgenberger married her partner, Charlie Haugk, whom she had been in a relationship with since the fall of 2019. This is Helgenberger's second marriage. Haugk is a professional actor and stunt performer, with credits for acting and stunt-work on action-superhero movies including Predator 2 (1990), Black Panther (2018), and Wonder Woman 1984.

Filmography

Film

Television

Video games

Awards and nominations

See also 

 List of stars on the Hollywood Walk of Fame

References

External links

 
 
 Marg Helgenberger Biography online at CSI on CBS

Living people
20th-century American actresses
21st-century American actresses
Actresses from Nebraska
American film actresses
American people of German descent
American people of Irish descent
American television actresses
American video game actresses
American voice actresses
Northwestern University School of Communication alumni
Outstanding Performance by a Supporting Actress in a Drama Series Primetime Emmy Award winners
People from Fremont, Nebraska
1958 births